Phytoecia fuscolateralis is a species of beetle in the family Cerambycidae. It was described by Stephan von Breuning in 1977. It is known from Somalia.

References

Endemic fauna of Somalia
Phytoecia
Beetles described in 1977